Tomislav Tomić (born 16 November 1990) is a Bosnian professional footballer who plays as a midfielder for Premier League of Bosnia and Herzegovina side Široki Brijeg.

Tomić made his senior debut for Široki Brijeg in 2008, and later played for Željezničar and Zrinjski Mostar in his homeland, winning a total of three league titles. With Slovenian club Olimpija Ljubljana, he won a double of Slovenian PrvaLiga and Slovenian Cup in 2017–18.

He made his senior international debut for Bosnia and Herzegovina in 2018, and made a total of two appearances.

Club career

Early career
Tomić came through Široki Brijeg's youth academy. He made his senior debut against Posušje on 23 November 2008 at the age of 18.

In the summer of 2011, Tomić was sent on a season-long loan to GOŠK Gabela, where he scored his first career goal on 7 April 2012 against his parent team Široki Brijeg.

In June 2012, he signed with Željezničar, where he stayed for three seasons and also won the league title in the 2012–13 season.

After a brief spell with Greek team Xanthi in 2015, he switched to Zrinjski Mostar before the second half of the 2015–16 season. With Zrinjski, he won two consecutive league titles, in 2015–16 and 2016–17.

Olimpija Ljubljana
On 12 June 2017, Tomić joined Slovenian side Olimpija Ljubljana on free transfer. He made his competitive debut for the club in UEFA Europa League qualifier against VPS on 29 June. Two weeks later, he made his league debut in a victory over Celje. Tomić won his first trophy with the club on 27 May 2018, when they were crowned league champions.

On 16 October 2018, Tomić extended his contract until June 2020.

He scored his first goal for Olimpija Ljubljana on 27 October 2018 against Maribor. In September 2019, Tomić played his 100th game for the team.

Tomić left Olimpija after the 2019–20 season following the decision to not renew his contract.

Admira Wacker
In August 2020, Tomić signed a three-year deal with Austrian outfit Admira Wacker. However, he stayed at Admira for just one season and featured in only 14 league matches, mainly due to the ankle injury. After the season, he returned to Olimpija on a two-year contract.

International career
In January 2018, Tomić received his first senior call-up to Bosnia and Herzegovina, for friendly games against the United States and Mexico. He debuted in a goalless draw against the former on 28 January.

Career statistics

Club

International

Honours
Željezničar
Bosnian Premier League: 2012–13

Zrinjski Mostar
Bosnian Premier League: 2015–16, 2016–17 

Olimpija Ljubljana
Slovenian PrvaLiga: 2017–18
Slovenian Cup: 2017–18, 2018–19

References

External links

1990 births
Living people
Sportspeople from Mostar
Croats of Bosnia and Herzegovina
Bosnia and Herzegovina footballers
Bosnia and Herzegovina international footballers
Bosnia and Herzegovina expatriate footballers
Association football midfielders
NK Široki Brijeg players
NK GOŠK Gabela players
FK Željezničar Sarajevo players
Xanthi F.C. players
HŠK Zrinjski Mostar players
NK Olimpija Ljubljana (2005) players
FC Admira Wacker Mödling players
NK Celje players
Premier League of Bosnia and Herzegovina players
Slovenian PrvaLiga players
Austrian Football Bundesliga players
Expatriate footballers in Greece
Expatriate footballers in Slovenia
Expatriate footballers in Austria
Bosnia and Herzegovina expatriate sportspeople in Greece
Bosnia and Herzegovina expatriate sportspeople in Slovenia
Bosnia and Herzegovina expatriate sportspeople in Austria